Forest Heights is an unincorporated community in Orange County, Texas, United States. It is located immediately east of State Highway 87 in northeastern Orange County, approximately five miles north of Little Cypress and eight miles north of Orange. According to the Handbook of Texas, the community had an estimated population of 250 in 2000. Forest Heights is part of the Beaumont–Port Arthur Metropolitan Statistical Area.

Public education in the community is provided by the Little Cypress-Mauriceville Consolidated Independent School District.

References

External links

Unincorporated communities in Orange County, Texas
Unincorporated communities in Texas
Beaumont–Port Arthur metropolitan area